Heartwell may refer to:

 Heartwell, Nebraska, United States
 George Heartwell (fl. 2004–2016), mayor of Grand Rapids, Michigan, United States

See also
 Heartwell Park Historic District, on the National Register of Historic Places listings in Adams County, Nebraska
 RNLB Louisa Heartwell (ON 495) (1902–1932), a lifeboat stationed at Cromer, Norfolk, England
 
 Hartville (disambiguation)
 Heartwellville, Vermont, United States